Leo Davis (born 11 March 1992) is a South African sailor. He competed in the Finn event at the 2020 Summer Olympics.

References

External links
 
 
 

1992 births
Living people
South African male sailors (sport)
Olympic sailors of South Africa
Sailors at the 2020 Summer Olympics – Finn
Place of birth missing (living people)
21st-century South African people